Taras Petrovich Tarasenko (Ukrainian: Тарас Петрович Тарасенко; born July 26, 1980, in the city of Bohuslav, Kyiv region) is a Ukrainian lawyer and arbitration manager. People's Deputy of Ukraine of the 9th convocation. He is a member of inter-factional union "People" in the Verkhovna Rada of Ukraine.

Parliamentary activity 
Member of the Verkhovna Rada Committee on Human Rights, Deoccupation and Reintegration of the Temporarily Occupied Territories in Donetsk, Luhansk Oblasts and the Autonomous Republic of Crimea, Sevastopol, National Minorities and International Relations, Chairman of the Subcommittee on Human Rights.

Member of the Ukrainian part of the Interparliamentary Assembly of the Verkhovna Rada of Ukraine, the Seimas of the Lithuania and the Seimas and the Senate of Poland.

Co-chair of the group for inter-parliamentary relations with Latvia.

Member of the group for inter-parliamentary relations with South Africa, Italy, Poland, and Canada.

Tarasenkno, along with three other deputies, is the author of a bill on judicial reform - 3711-2, which, according to the media, "actually opposes changes in this branch of government."

Source 

 Tarasenko Taras Petrovich on the website of the Verkhovna Rada of Ukraine

Reference 

Living people
Ukrainian politicians
1980 births